The 2022–23 Lipscomb Bisons men's basketball team represented Lipscomb University in the 2022–23 NCAA Division I men's basketball season. The Bisons, led by fourth-year head coach Lennie Acuff, played their home games at the Allen Arena in Nashville, Tennessee as members of the ASUN Conference.

Previous season
The Bisons finished the 2021–22 season 14–19, 6–10 in ASUN play to finish in fourth place in the West Division. In the ASUN tournament, they defeated North Florida in the first round before losing to Liberty in the quarterfinals.

Roster

Schedule and results

|-
!colspan=12 style=| Non-conference regular season

|-
!colspan=9 style=| ASUN Conference regular season

|-
!colspan=12 style=| ASUN tournament

|-

Sources

References

Lipscomb Bisons men's basketball seasons
Lipscomb Bisons
Lipscomb Bisons men's basketball
Lipscomb Bisons men's basketball